Solanum etuberosum is a species of wild potato in the family Solanaceae, endemic to central Chile. Although it does not bear tubers (or has tubers that are little more than thickened rhizomes), it is still being extensively studied for its resistance to Potato virus Y, Potato leafroll virus, green peach aphids, and frost. Due to its large, showy flowers it may have some use as an ornamental.

References

etuberosum
Endemic flora of Chile
Flora of central Chile
Plants described in 1834